Serhiy Voronin (born 24 March 1987) is a professional Ukrainian football defender who plays for FC Livyi Bereh Kyiv.

Career
Voronin began his playing career with FC Dynamo Kyiv's third team. He joined different clubs from the Ukrainian Second and First Leagues. In 2007 he signed for Lechia Gdańsk on a free transfer. Voronin failed to make an appearance for Lechia during the 2007–08 season in which the team won promotion to the Ekstraklasa by winning the II liga. Voronin was available to leave on a free after Lechia's promotion and joined Knyazha-2 Schaslyve in the summer of 2008. In 2011, he signed a contract with PFC Sevastopol in the Ukrainian Premier League. Voronin made his Premier League debut entering as a second-half substitute against FC Shakhtar Donetsk on 3 March 2011.

References

External links 
 Profile on Sevstopol club site (Rus)
 

1987 births
Footballers from Kyiv
Living people
Ukrainian footballers
FC Dynamo-2 Kyiv players
FC Dynamo-3 Kyiv players
FC CSKA Kyiv players
Lechia Gdańsk players
FC Knyazha-2 Shchaslyve players
FC Nafkom Brovary players
FC Nyva Vinnytsia players
FC Sevastopol players
FC Sevastopol-2 players
FC Volyn Lutsk players
FC Stal Kamianske players
Expatriate footballers in Poland
Ukrainian Premier League players
Association football defenders
PFC Sumy players
FC Lviv players
FC Chornomorets Odesa players
FC Livyi Bereh Kyiv players
Ukraine youth international footballers